Odesa Raion (also sometimes spelled as Odessa Raion;) is a raion (district) of Odesa Oblast, Ukraine. It was created in July 2020 as part of the reform of administrative divisions of Ukraine.  The center of the raion is the city of Odesa. Population:

Administrative division
At the time of establishment, the raion consisted of 22 hromadas:

Urban hromadas
 Biliaivka urban hromada
 Chornomorskurban hromada
 Odesa urban hromada
 Teplodar urban hromada
 Yuzhne urban hromada

Settlement hromadas
 Avanhard settlement hromada
 Chornomorske settlement hromada
 Dobroslav settlement hromada
 Ovidiopol settlement hromada
 Tairove settlement hromada
 Velykodolynske settlement hromada

Rural hromadas
 Dalnyk rural hromada
 Dachne rural hromada
 Fontanka rural hromada
 Krasnosilka rural hromada
 Maiaky rural hromada
 Nerubaiske rural hromada
 Velykyi Dalnyk rural hromada
 Vyhoda rural hromada
 Vyzyrka rural hromada
 Usatove rural hromada
 Yasky rural hromada

References

Raions of Odesa Oblast
Ukrainian raions established during the 2020 administrative reform